Spilomyia diophthalma is a species of Hoverfly in the family Syrphidae.

Distribution
Sweden.

References

Eristalinae
Flies described in 1758
Taxa named by Carl Linnaeus
Diptera of Europe